Yumu is a minor Kainji language of Nigeria. It is listed as a potential Kambari language by Roger Blench, however it does not have an Ethnologue nor Glottolog entry.

The village of Yumu, said to be "of obscure origin", is located on the western side of Kainji Lake in Agwara District, Niger State, adjacent to the areas of the divergent Kainji languages of Reshe, Lopa and Laru.

A 1979 linguistic survey of Nigeria, citing Rev. A. Washbrook, lists Yumu as either a dialect of Lopa or of Kambari.

References

Kambari languages
Languages of Nigeria